Grace Buzu (born 6 October 1968) is a Ugandan sprinter. She competed in the women's 4 × 100 metres relay at the 1988 Summer Olympics. Buzu won a bronze medal in the 4 x 100 metres relay at the 1987 All-Africa Games.

References

External links
 

1968 births
Living people
Athletes (track and field) at the 1988 Summer Olympics
Ugandan female sprinters
Olympic athletes of Uganda
African Games bronze medalists for Uganda
African Games medalists in athletics (track and field)
Place of birth missing (living people)
Athletes (track and field) at the 1987 All-Africa Games
Olympic female sprinters
20th-century Ugandan women
21st-century Ugandan women